A total solar eclipse took place on Monday, December 14, 2020, when the Moon passed between Earth and the Sun, thereby totally or partly obscuring the image of the Sun for a viewer on Earth. Totality occurred in a narrow path across Earth's surface across parts of the South Pacific Ocean, southern South America, and the South Atlantic Ocean, when the Moon's apparent diameter was larger than the Sun's so all direct sunlight was blocked. The partial solar eclipse was visible over a surrounding region thousands of kilometres wide, including parts of the Pacific Ocean, South America, southwestern Africa, and the Atlantic Ocean. The Moon's apparent diameter was larger than average because the eclipse occurred only 1.8 days after perigee (on December 12, 2020).

Visibility

Chile
Totality made landfall in Puerto Saavedra, before traversing through portions of Araucanía Region, Los Ríos Region, and a very small part of Bío Bío Region.  Cities in the path included Temuco, Villarrica, and Pucón.  Totality was also visible on Mocha Island. The eclipse's path was similar to the solar eclipse of February 26, 2017. It occurred just 17 months after the solar eclipse of July 2, 2019 and, like the 2019 eclipse, was also visible from Chile and Argentina. It was also a partial solar eclipse in Bolivia,  Brazil, Ecuador, Paraguay, Peru and Uruguay.

Argentina
Totality was visible across the Northern Patagonia (specifically the provinces of Neuquén and Río Negro), passing through cities including Piedra del Águila, Sierra Colorada, Ministro Ramos Mexía, Junín de los Andes, and partially in San Martín de los Andes and San Carlos de Bariloche.

Scientific observations
The ionospheric effects of the eclipse were expected to be monitored as part of the December 2020 Eclipse Festival of Frequency Measurement, a citizen science experiment organized through the Amateur Radio Science Citizen Investigation (HamSCI). Also, a prediction was made for a group of ionospheric stations in South America, using a numerical model (SUPIM-INPE), of the ionospheric response to this event.

Gallery

Related eclipses 
This eclipse took place one lunar year after the Solar eclipse of December 26, 2019.

Eclipses of 2020 
 A penumbral lunar eclipse on January 10.
 A penumbral lunar eclipse on June 5.
 An annular solar eclipse on June 21.
 A penumbral lunar eclipse on July 5.
 A penumbral lunar eclipse on November 30.
 A total solar eclipse on December 14.

Tzolkinex 
 Preceded: Solar eclipse of November 3, 2013 

 Followed: Solar eclipse of January 26, 2028

Half-Saros cycle 
 Preceded: Lunar eclipse of December 10, 2011

 Followed: Lunar eclipse of December 20, 2029

Tritos 
 Preceded: Solar eclipse of January 15, 2010

 Followed: Solar eclipse of November 14, 2031

Solar Saros 142 
 Preceded: Solar eclipse of December 4, 2002

 Followed: Solar eclipse of December 26, 2038

Inex 
 Preceded: Solar eclipse of January 4, 1992

 Followed: Solar eclipse of November 25, 2049

Triad 
 Preceded: Solar eclipse of February 14, 1934

 Followed: Solar eclipse of October 16, 2107

Solar eclipses of 2018–2021

Saros 142

Metonic cycle

References

External links 

 solar-eclipse.de: The total solar eclipse of 12/14/2020

2020 12 14
2020 in science
2020 in South America
2020 12 14
December 2020 events